Monster Train is a roguelike deck-building video game, developed by American studio Shiny Shoe. It was released on May 21, 2020 on Steam and was later released for Xbox One on December 17, 2020 and for iOS on October 27, 2022. A Complete Edition of the game titled Monster Train First Class was released for Nintendo Switch on August 19, 2021. The game received positive reviews, being nominated to the Game Awards 2020, in the category Best Strategy/Tactics Games of 2020

Gameplay 
The game has a vertical field, a train with 4 floors, with a pyre on the top floor. The enemies will try to reach the pyre to destroy it, and the player must protect it to achieve victory. For this, the player will use several cards that can summon monsters or activate special effects to defeat the invaders, but the player can only summon their creatures in the train's first three floors.

Reception 
The game received positive reviews, reaching 86 points on Metacritic. Dan Stapleton, from IGN, wrote that the game is "a ticket to dozens – if not hundreds – of hours of challenging and surprising roguelike deckbuilding runs, thanks in large part to its mechanically diverse set of decks and the way they interact with each other when combined in different ways", and in his verdict, scored the game 9/10. Cody Peterson, from Screen Rant, wrote "Monster Train is an enjoyable deck building roguelike game that manages to reinvent both genres with some interesting new game mechanics", giving the game a 4 out of 5 star rating.

Reviewing the Nintendo Switch version, titled Monster Train First Class, Waselenchuk of COGconnected praised the extensive amount of enemies and cards available; on the other hand, the author lamented the lack of touch screen functionality for the game: "I think many would agree; card games are often the ones that benefit the most from a touch screen".

As of January 2023, the game had over 15,000 reviews on Steam, with an overall rating of "Overwhelmingly Positive" (equating to "10/10" and 96% positive reviews).

Awards 
The game was nominated to the Game Awards 2020, in the category Best Strategy/Tactics Games of 2020. However, the winner was Crusader Kings III.

References 

2020 video games
Deck-building card games
Digital collectible card games
Fantasy video games
Indie video games
Nintendo Switch games
Roguelike video games
Single-player video games
Video games developed in the United States
Windows games
Works set on trains
Xbox Cloud Gaming games